The Eids Fiord Formation is a geologic formation in Nunavut, Canada. It preserves fossils dating back to the Devonian period.

See also

 List of fossiliferous stratigraphic units in Nunavut

References
 

Devonian Nunavut
Devonian southern paleotropical deposits